Alex Schlopy (born July 25, 1992) is an American freeskier from Park City, Utah. He was the winner of a gold medal at the 2011 Winter X Games in the big air contest. The following week, he won the gold medal in slopestyle at the 2011 FIS Freestyle World Ski Championships.

Schlopy attended The Winter Sports School in Park City. His mother, Holly Flanders, was a three-time winner on the FIS Alpine Skiing World Cup circuit. His father, Todd Schlopy, is a former NFL placekicker for the Buffalo Bills. Todd's cousin, Erik Schlopy, is a former alpine skier who competed at three editions of the Olympics.

References

External links
 
 

American male freestyle skiers
Living people
People from Park City, Utah
X Games athletes
1992 births